Ismael Enrique Cruz Córdova (born April 7, 1987) is a Puerto Rican actor who gained national attention playing Mando on Sesame Street. Cruz also had a role in the Showtime original series Ray Donovan, and in the third season of Berlin Station, as Rafael Torres, an SOG operative. He plays Arondir in the TV series The Lord of the Rings: The Rings of Power, released in September 2022 on Amazon Prime.

Filmography

Film

Television

References

External links
 

Living people
1987 births
People from Aguas Buenas, Puerto Rico
Puerto Rican male television actors